(Benton) Seymour Rabinovitch (19 February 1919 – 2 August 2014) was a Professor of Chemistry at the University of Washington in Seattle, whose research including developing measurements for the efficiency with which energy is transferred between molecules in gas phase chemical reactions.
Rabinovitch was an editor of the Annual Review of Physical Chemistry and of the Journal of the American Chemical Society.

After formally retiring, Rabinovitch became a silversmith, studying the chemistry of silver and collecting and writing about silver. In 2000, Rabinovitch became an Honorary Liveryman of the Worshipful Company of Goldsmiths in London. His collection of silver slicers and servers became part of the Victoria and Albert Museum's permanent collection in 2005.

Career  
Benton Seymour Rabinovitch was born to Rochelle  (Schacter)  and  Samuel  Rabinovitch, both immigrants to Montreal, Canada. In spite of the financial difficulties resulting from the Great Depression and anti-Jewish educational quotas, Benton Rabinovitch earned his BSc from McGill University in 1939, and his PhD in 1942. His  Ph.D. topic was Studies  in  chemical kinetics (academic research) and the detection of vesicants (war research). 

Rabinovitch joined the Canadian government's Chemical Warfare Laboratory in Ottawa, initially as a civilian. He was subsequently sent to an officer's training camp in December 1942, and then was sent to England to serve as a Captain in the Chemical Warfare Division of the Canadian Army in 1943.  Building on his Ph.D. work. Rabinovitch was able to develop a simple method for detecting the chemical warfare agent mustard gas.  In Rabinovitch's method, cloth swatches were treated with dyestuffs and  worn on clothing. The resulting indicators changed color in the presence of mustard gas, warning soldiers of its presence.  After D-Day, Rabinovitch's unit landed at Courseulles-sur-Mer, France. He and his team of scientists were tasked with examining German factories and battlefields in order to collect evidence of violations of the Geneva Convention on Weaponry.

After  World War I ended, Rabinovitch taught briefly at Khaki College in Watford, England. He then obtained a postdoctoral fellowship in physical chemistry with Professor George Kistiakowsky at Harvard University.

He joined the faculty of University of Washington in Seattle as an Assistant Professor of Chemistry in 1948. He became a full professor in 1957.

Over four decades, Rabinovitch established himself as a leader in the field of chemical dynamics.  He and his students devised novel means to determine quantitative measurements of the efficiency of energy transfer between molecules in collisions: both gas-phase molecule–molecule  collisions  and   collisions  between  molecules  and  solid  surfaces. He established correlations between vibrational energy in molecules and rates of chemical reactions.  He was the first researcher to experimentally validate important theories in physical chemistry such as the Rice–Ramsperger–Kassel–Marcus (RRKM) theory. His experiments and the mathematical techniques that he developed have contributed to the understanding of chemical kinetics, molecular  dynamics, and gas-phase ion chemistry.

From 1977–1985, Rabinovitch was the editor of the Annual Review of Physical Chemistry. He was also an editor for  the Journal  of  the  American  Chemical  Society and served as Chair of the Division of Physical Chemistry for the American Chemical Society. Following his formal retirement from academia, Rabinovitch retained academic status as Professor Emeritus in 1986, and continued to scientific experimentation, writing and publishing.

Silversmithing

After retiring from the University of Washington in 1986, Rabinovitch became a silversmith and studied the chemistry of silver. He was particularly fascinated by antique silver slicers and servers, which he collected.  

He wrote authoritatively on their history and chemistry, including the books Antique Silver Servers for the Dining Table: Style, Function, Food and Social History (1991) and 
Contemporary Silver: Commissioning, Designing, Collecting (2000).

He published in magazines such as  Silver Magazine, Silver Society Journal  and Metalsmith. Rabinovitch was a member of the Silver Society  of London. In 2000, Rabinovitch became an Honorary Liveryman of the Worshipful Company of Goldsmiths. 

As a patron of silversmithing, Rabinovitch commissioned the creation of more than 60 cake, pudding, and fish-servers from artists in the U.S. and Britain.  His collection of silver servers has been the basis for a number of exhibitions, the first of which was Slices of silver at Goldsmiths' Hall in London in 1995. Later exhibitions include the Schneider Museum of Art in 1998 and 2003;
the Winnipeg Art  Gallery, Canada; the Aberdeen Art  Gallery,  Scotland; and the National Ornamental Metal Museum, Memphis, Tennessee. 
His collection was given to London's Victoria and Albert Museum in 2005, becoming part of its permanent collection.

Personal life
Rabinovitch married Marilyn Werby of Boston in 1949.  They had four children. Marilyn died in 1974  due to cancer. In 1980, Rabinovitch married Flora Reitman of Montreal, Canada. He published a children's book, Higgledy  piggledy: a tale  of  four  little  pigs (2013) based on stories he had told his children.

As a philanthropist Rabinovitch established an  annual purchase award, later an endowment, to enable the  University of Washington's Metals Program to acquire student pieces.  The Marilyn Werby Rabinovitch Memorial Fund for the School of Art Metals Program continued from 1993 to 2008, resulting in the Marilyn Werby Rabinovitch Purchase 
Award Collection.

Seymour Rabinovitch died on August 2, 2014 in Seattle, Washington.

Awards and honours
1968, Fellow of the American Physical Society (APS)
1979,  Fellow of the American Academy of Arts and Sciences (AAAS) 
 1984, Peter Debye Award, American Chemical Society (ACS)
 1984, Polanyi Medal, Royal Society
1987, Fellow of the Royal Society
 1991,  Honorary Doctorate of Science, Technion – Israel Institute of Technology

References

1919 births
2014 deaths
Fellows of the American Physical Society
Fellows of the Royal Society
University of Washington faculty
Annual Reviews (publisher) editors
Academic journal editors
Canadian emigrants to the United States